The Llanquihue Islands are a group of islands to the east of Larrouy Island, extending northward for  from the west coast of Graham Land, Antarctica. They were charted by the British Graham Land Expedition under John Rymill, 1934–37. The name appears on a Chilean government chart of 1947 and is after Llanquihue Province in Chile.

The northernmost island is Dog Island.

See also 
 List of Antarctic and sub-Antarctic islands

References

Islands of Graham Land
Graham Coast